Department stores in Japan are referred to as hyakkaten or depāto (デパート), an alteration of the English term.

History
The first "modern-style" department store in Japan was Mitsukoshi, founded in 1904, which has its root as a kimono store called Echigoya from 1673. However, Matsuzakaya has an even longer history, dating from 1611. The kimono store changed to a department store in 1910. In 1924, the Matsuzakaya store in Ginza allowed street shoes to be worn indoors, something innovative at the time. These former kimono-shop-turned-department-stores dominated the market in its early department store history. They sold, or instead displayed, luxurious product which contributed to their sophisticated atmospheres. Some Japanese department stores were developed by railway companies. There have been many private railway operators in the nation and, from the 1920s, they started to build department stores directly linked to their lines' termini. Both Seibu and Hankyu were developed by rail companies.

Characteristics
Since the 1980s, Japanese department stores have been facing fierce competition from supermarkets and convenience stores, gradually losing their presence. Still, depāto are bastions of several aspects of cultural conservatism in the country. Giving gift certificates for prestigious department stores is used as a formal present in Japan.

Department stores in Japan generally offer a wide range of services and can include foreign exchange, travel reservations, ticket sales for local concerts and other events.

Due to their roots, many Japanese department stores have sections devoted to kimono and traditional Japanese crafts, including pottery and lacquerware. The basement level usually has a grocery and food court, and on the roof may be garden and aquatic supplies, pets, and a children's play area.

Operating hours are usually from 10 am to 8 pm. Some close one day a week, often a weekday.

Famous department stores in Japan
Some stores also have branches outside Japan.

Nationwide

 (fashion oriented, nationwide)

 (hobby oriented, nationwide)

Hokkaido
 - part of Istean Mitsukoshi Holdings

Kantō region

 (fashion oriented)
 (fashion oriented)

109 (Ichi-maru-kyū) (fashion oriented, Kantō region)
 (hobby oriented, nationwide)

Chūbu region

Kansai region

Chūgoku, Shikoku region

Kyūshū region
 - part of Istean Mitsukoshi Holdings

Defunct in Japan

 (from Yomiuri Group and Isetan Mitsukoshi)
 (from Sogo & Seibu)

See also

References 

Retailing in Japan